is a former Japanese football player.

Playing career
Wakai was born in Fuchu on September 22, 1974. After graduating from University of Tsukuba, he joined his local club Sanfrecce Hiroshima in 1997. Although he played several matches as substitute forward, he could hardly play in the match and retired end of 1997 season.

Club statistics

References

External links

biglobe.ne.jp

1974 births
Living people
University of Tsukuba alumni
Association football people from Hiroshima Prefecture
Japanese footballers
J1 League players
Sanfrecce Hiroshima players
Association football forwards